Riverhead was a small village of 20 families in 1864. It is now a town in the St. Mary's area with a population of over 400 by 1968.

Demographics 

See also
List of cities and towns in Newfoundland and Labrador

References 

Populated coastal places in Canada
Towns in Newfoundland and Labrador